3AW Breakfast is an Australian breakfast radio show hosted by Ross Stevenson and Russel Howcroft on 3AW in Melbourne. A daily podcast of the morning's show is also produced.

History 
In 1989, Ross Stevenson, Denis Connell and anchor Dean Banks joined 3AW from 3AK after building a cult following. The breakfast show was initially named Lawyers, Guns and Money. Connell was sacked in 1991 by program director Steve Price and the show was rebranded to Breakfast with Ross and Dean.

For the following 10 years, Stevenson and Banks established themselves and their style as a ratings success. In December 2000, Banks decided to retire, again leaving Stevenson to find a new partner.

In 2001, John Burns joined Ross Stevenson as co-host following the retirement of Dean Banks. Breakfast with Ross and John was the station's top rating program.

In June 2020, 3AW announced that Howcroft will join as co-host from Monday 3 August, following John Burns' retirement from radio.

Jacqueline Felgate, Emily Power, Stephen Quartermain and Jimmy Bartel are current fill-in hosts of the show.

Over the years, Kate Stevenson, Tony Leonard, Darren James and Peter Maher have been previous fill-in hosts of the show.

Regular Segments 

 The Rumour File -  Listeners are encouraged to call in and anonymously spill the beans and break the news. The segment airs weekdays at 7:07am.
US & UK Report - Bob Tarlau provides an update on what's happening in the United States and Malcolm Stuart provides an update what's happening in the United Kingdom. The segment airs weekdays at 6:45am
What The Papers Say - Ross and Russel cover the news headlines from the newspapers. 
 Sport Report with Jon Anderson - Herald Sun's Jon Anderson provides sport updates throughout the show. The segment airs weekdays at 7:25am.
Entertainment with Peter Ford - Showbiz reporter Peter Ford has the latest entertainment news. The segment airs on Monday and Thursday at 8:20am.
 Food with Jacqueline Felgate - Jacqueline Felgate reviews the latest restaurants around Melbourne. The segment airs Friday morning at 8:15am.

References

External links 

 3AW Breakfast
 3AW

Australian radio programs